"Fall to Pieces" is a song by Canadian singer-songwriter Avril Lavigne from her second studio album, Under My Skin (2004). The song was written by Lavigne and was co-written and produced by Raine Maida. It was released April 18, 2005, as the fourth single from the album in North America and select European markets, while "He Wasn't" was released internationally.

Composition
"Fall to Pieces" is a guitar-driven ballad set to a moderate rock tempo of 92 BPM. It was composed in the key of C major, with a vocal range of G3-E5.

Chart performance
"Fall to Pieces" peaked at number 175 on the Russian Airplay Top 100 Chart. In the US, it reached number six on the Bubbling Under Hot 100 Singles chart and number 55 on the Billboard Pop 100, in addition to reaching numbers 18 and 34, respectively, on the Adult Top 40 and Mainstream Top 40 airplay charts. In Canada, "Fall to Pieces" reached number six on the Radio & Records CHR/Pop Top 30 chart and at number 4 on the magazine's Hot AC Top 30 chart.

Track listings and formats
 CD
 "Fall to Pieces" – 3:28
 "Suggested Callout Hook" – 0:10

Credits and personnel
Credits and personnel are adapted from Fall to Pieces CD single liner notes.
 Avril Lavigne – writer, vocals
 Raine Maida – writer, producer, guitar
 Tom Lord-Alge – mixing engineer
 Femio Hernandez – assistant mixing engineer
 Leon Zervos – mastering at Sterling Sound (New York City)
 Brian Garcia – recording engineer, digital editing
 Jason Cupp – assistant recording engineer
 Jason Lader – digital editing, bass, programming
 Phil X – guitar
 Nick Lashley – guitar
 Kenny Aronoff – drums, percussion

Charts

Weekly charts

Year-end charts

Release history

References

2000s ballads
Avril Lavigne songs
2005 songs
2005 singles
RCA Records singles
Sony BMG singles
Songs written by Avril Lavigne
Songs written by Raine Maida
Rock ballads